Postmodernist film is a classification for works that articulate the themes and ideas of postmodernism through the medium of cinema. Some of the goals of postmodernist film are to subvert the mainstream conventions of narrative structure and characterization, and to test the audience's suspension of disbelief. Typically, such films also break down the cultural divide between high and low art and often upend typical portrayals of gender, race, class, genre, and time with the goal of creating something that does not abide by traditional narrative expression.

Specific elements
Modernist film came to maturity in the era between WWI and WWII with characteristics such as montage and symbolic imagery, and often took the form of expressionist cinema and surrealist cinema (as seen in the works of Fritz Lang and Luis Buñuel) while postmodernist film – similar to postmodernism as a whole – is a reaction to the modernist works and to their tendencies (such as nostalgia and angst). Modernist cinema has been said to have "explored and exposed the formal concerns of the medium by placing them at the forefront of consciousness. Modernist cinema questions and made visible the meaning-production practices of film." The auteur theory and idea of an author creating a work from their singular vision was a cultural advancement that coincided with the further maturation of modernist cinema. It has been said that "To investigate the transparency of the image is modernist but to undermine its reference to reality is to engage with the aesthetics of postmodernism." The modernist film has more faith in the author, the individual, and the accessibility of reality itself (and is generally more sincere in tone) than the postmodernist film.

Postmodernism is in many ways interested in the liminal space that would be typically ignored by more modernist or traditionally narrative offerings. Henri Bergson writes in his book Creative Evolution, "The obscurity is cleared up, the contradiction vanishes, as soon as we place ourselves along the transition, in order to distinguish states in it by making cross cuts therein in thoughts. The reason is that there is more in the transition than the series of states, that is to say, the possible cuts--more in the movement than the series of position, that is to say, the possible stops."

Postmodernist film is often separated from modernist cinema and traditional narrative film by three key characteristics. One of them is an extensive use of homage or pastiche. The second element is meta-reference or self-reflexivity, highlighting the construction and relation of the image to other images in media and not to any kind of external reality. A self-referential film calls the viewer's attention – either through characters' knowledge of their own fictional nature, or through visuals – that the film itself is only a film. This is sometimes achieved by emphasizing the unnatural look of an image which seems contrived. Another technique used to achieve meta-reference is the use of intertextuality, in which the film's characters reference or discuss other works of fiction. Additionally, many postmodern films tell stories that unfold out of chronological order, deconstructing or fragmenting time so as to highlight the fact that what is appearing on screen is constructed. A third common element is a bridging of the gap between highbrow and lowbrow activities and artistic styles – e.g., a parody of Michelangelo's Sistine Chapel ceiling in which Adam is reaching for a McDonald's burger rather than the hand of God. The use of homage and pastiche can, in and of itself, result in a fusion of high and low art.

Lastly, contradictions of all sorts – whether it be in visual technique, characters' morals, etc. – are crucial to postmodernism.

Specific postmodern examples

Once Upon a Time in the West 
Sergio Leone's Once Upon a Time in the West has often been referred to by critics as an example of a postmodern Western. The 1968 spaghetti Western revolves around a beautiful widow, a mysterious gunslinger playing a harmonica, a ruthless villain, and a lovable but hard-nosed bandit who just escaped from jail. The story was developed by Leone, Bernardo Bertolucci, and Dario Argento by watching classic American Westerns, and the final product is a deliberate attempt to both pay homage to and subvert Western genre conventions and audience expectations. Among the most notable examples of intertextuality are the plot similarities to Johnny Guitar, the visual reference to High Noon of a clock stopped at high noon in the middle of a gunfight, and the casting of Henry Fonda as the story's sadistic antagonist which was a deliberate subversion of Fonda's image as a hero established in such films as My Darling Clementine and Fort Apache, both directed by John Ford.

Blade Runner

Ridley Scott's Blade Runner might be the best-known postmodernist film. Scott's 1982 film is about a future dystopia where "replicants" (human cyborgs) have been invented and are deemed dangerous enough to hunt down when they escape. There is tremendous effacement of boundaries between genres and cultures, and styles that are generally more separate, along with the fusion of disparate styles and times, a common trope in postmodernist cinema.  The fusion of noir and science-fiction is another example of the film deconstructing cinema and genre. This embodies the postmodern tendency to destroy boundaries and genres into a self-reflexive product. The 2017 Academy Award-winning sequel Blade Runner 2049 also tackled postmodern anxieties.

Pulp Fiction

Quentin Tarantino's Pulp Fiction is another example of a postmodernist film. The Palm d'Or-winning film tells the interweaving stories of gangsters, a boxer, and robbers. The 1994 film breaks down chronological time and demonstrates a particular fascination with intertextuality: bringing in texts from both traditionally "high" and "low" realms of art. This foregrounding of media places the self as "a loose, transitory combination of media consumption choices." Pulp Fiction fractures time (by the use of asynchronous time lines) and by using styles of prior decades and combining them together in the movie. By focusing on intertextuality and the subjectivity of time, Pulp Fiction demonstrates the postmodern obsession with signs and subjective perspective as the exclusive location of anything resembling meaning.

Other selected examples

Aside from the aforementioned Once Upon a Time in the West, the Blade Runner sequels and Pulp Fiction, postmodern cinema includes films such as:

Hellzapoppin' (1941)
Duck Amuck (1953, also been called a modernist film)
All That Heaven Allows (1955; also been called a modernist film)
Written on the Wind (1956)
A Movie (1958)
Hiroshima mon amour (1959; also been called a modernist film)
L'Avventura (1960, also been called a modernist film)
Blast of Silence (1961)
Last Year at Marienbad (1961, also been called a modernist film)
8½ (1963; also been called a modernist film)
Scorpio Rising (1964)
Woman in the Dunes (1964)
Pierrot Le Fou (1965, also been called a modernist film)
Alphaville (1965)
Persona (1966; also been called a modernist film)
Batman (1966)
Blowup (1966; also been called a modernist film)
Weekend (1967)
Branded to Kill (1967)
Casino Royale (1967)
Playtime (1967; also been called a modernist film)
Night of the Living Dead (1968)
Teorema (1968)
Death by Hanging (1968)
2001: A Space Odyssey (1968; also called a modernist film)
The Color of Pomegranates (1969; also been called a modernist film)
Funeral Parade of Roses (1969)
Performance (1970)
The Conformist (1970)
El Topo (1970)
The Discreet Charm of the Bourgeoisie (1972)
Day for Night (1973; also called a modernist film)
The Holy Mountain (1973; also been called a modernist film)
Blazing Saddles (1974)
Pastoral: To Die in the Country (1974)
Celine and Julie Go Boating (1974)
Monty Python and the Holy Grail (1975)	
Taxi Driver (1976)
Star Wars (1977)
Close Encounters of the Third Kind (1977)
House (1977)
Dawn of the Dead (1978)
All That Jazz (1979)
Alien (1979)
Stalker (1979)
Apocalypse Now (1979)
The Gods Must Be Crazy (1980)
Diva (1981)
Escape from New York (1981)
Ms. 45 (1981)
The Thing (1982)
The Atomic Cafe (1982)
Koyaanisqatsi (1982)
Dead Men Don't Wear Plaid (1982)
Sans Soleil (1983)
Videodrome (1983)
Zelig (1983)
Love Streams (1984)
The Terminator (1984)
Repo Man (1984)
Brazil (1985)
Shoah (1985)
Mishima: A Life in Four Chapters (1985)
After Hours (1985)
Terrorizers (1986)
Mauvais Sang (1986)
Blue Velvet (1986)
A Zed and Two Noughts (1986) 
Walker (1987)
The Princess Bride (1987)
Innerspace (1987)
Wings of Desire (1987)
Om-Dar-B-Dar (1988)
Akira (1988)
The Thin Blue Line (1988)
Who Framed Roger Rabbit (1988)
They Live (1988)
Crimes and Misdemeanors (1989) 
Jesus of Montreal (1989)
sex, lies and videotape (1989)
Roger & Me (1989)
Edward Scissorhands (1990)
Close-Up (1990)
Gremlins 2: The New Batch (1990)
Miller's Crossing (1990)
Barton Fink (1991)
JFK (1991)
 The Double Life of Veronique (1991)
Until the End of the World (1991)
 Wax or the Discovery of Television Among the Bees (1991)
Aladdin (1992)
The Player (1992)
Reservoir Dogs (1992)
Falling Down (1993)
Groundhog Day (1993)
Last Action Hero (1993)
The Nightmare Before Christmas (1993)
True Romance (1993)
Through the Olive Trees (1994)
Sátántangó (1994)
Chungking Express (1994)
Forrest Gump (1994)
Natural Born Killers (1994)
Fallen Angels (1995)
Dead Man (1995)
Get Shorty (1995)
Underground (1995)
Showgirls (1995)
 From Dusk till Dawn (1996)
Schizopolis (1996)
Goodbye South, Goodbye (1996)
Scream (1996)	 
Irma Vep (1996)
End of Evangelion (1997)
Lost Highway (1997)
Gummo (1997)
Boogie Nights (1997)
Dark City (1997)
Starship Troopers (1997)
Funny Games (1997)
The Big Lebowski (1998)
New Rose Hotel (1998)
Run Lola Run (1998)	
The Hole (1998)
The Truman Show (1998)
Pleasantville (1998)
Ghost Dog: The Way of the Samurai (1999)
Fight Club (1999)	
The Straight Story (1999)
American Beauty (1999)	
The Blair Witch Project (1999)	
The Matrix (1999)
Magnolia (1999)
American Psycho (2000)		
Memento (2000) 	
Dancer in the Dark (2000)
Werckmeister Harmonies (2000)
 Requiem for a Dream (2000)
 Timecode (2000)
 Rejected (2000)
 Moulin Rouge! (2001) 
 Shrek (2001)
 Waking Life (2001)
 The Royal Tenenbaums (2001) 
Mulholland Drive (2001)	
Donnie Darko (2001)
All About Lily Chou-Chou (2001)
The Man Who Wasn't There (2001)
Pulse (2001)
Far From Heaven (2002)
Lost in Translation (2003)
The Fog of War (2003)
Zatōichi (2003)
Eternal Sunshine of the Spotless Mind (2004)
Tropical Malady (2004)
The Life Aquatic with Steve Zissou (2004)
The Machinist (2004)
Shaun of the Dead (2004)	
Brick (2005)
Grizzly Man (2005)
Still Life (2006)
Marie Antoinette (2006)
Enchanted (2007)
I'm Not There (2007)
The Beaches of Agnès (2008)
Synecdoche, New York (2008)
Hunger (2008)
Waltz with Bashir (2008)
Enter the Void (2009)
Shutter Island (2010)
Exit Through the Gift Shop (2010)
Inception (2010)
Drive (2011)
 The Skin I Live In (2011)
Shame (2011)
We Need to Talk About Kevin (2011)
The Act of Killing (2012)
Tabu (2012)
Cloud Atlas (2012)
Holy Motors (2012)
Post Tenebras Lux (2012)
Wreck-It Ralph (2012)
Get a Horse! (2013)
Only Lovers Left Alive (2013)
Her (2013)
Only God Forgives (2013)
Boyhood (2014)
Clouds of Sils Maria (2014)
The Lego Movie (2014)
The Look of Silence (2014)
Cemetery of Splendour (2015)
World of Tomorrow (2015)
La La Land (2016)
Get Out (2017)
The Square (2017)
Under the Silver Lake (2018)
Wonderstruck (2017)
Spider-Man: Into the Spider-Verse (2018)
Sorry to Bother You (2018)
The House That Jack Built (2018)
Long Day's Journey into Night (2018)
Pain & Glory (2019)
Bad Luck Banging or Loony Porn (2021)
Bergman Island (2021)
Last Night in Soho (2021)
Everything Everywhere All At Once (2022)
White Noise (2022)

List of notable postmodernist filmmakers

Sofia Coppola
Sergio Leone
Steve McQueen
Wong Kar-Wai
Don Hertzfeldt
Christopher Nolan
Douglas Sirk (also been called a modernist filmmaker)
Quentin Tarantino
Joel and Ethan Coen
Oliver Stone
Robert Altman
Woody Allen
David Lynch
Tim Burton
Joe Dante
Errol Morris (also been called an anti-postmodernist filmmaker)
Brian De Palma
David Cronenberg
Ridley Scott
Wes Anderson
Michael Haneke
Paul Thomas Anderson
Paul Verhoeven
Steven Soderbergh
Pedro Almodovar
John Waters
George A. Romero
Guy Maddin
Michel Gondry
Spike Jonze
Tex Avery (also been called a modernist filmmaker)
Abel Ferrara
Stanley Kubrick (also been called a modernist filmmaker)
Michael Moore
Jordan Peele
Peter Greenaway
Kevin Smith

See also
Remodernist film, one of the many critical stances against postmodernist cinema
Cinephilia
Art film
New Hollywood, similar in content
Social thriller
Vulgar auteurism
Auteur theory
Extreme cinema
Independent film
Indiewood
Hyperlink cinema
Slow cinema
Arthouse action film
Remix culture
American Eccentric Cinema
Maximalist and minimalist cinema
Cult film
Arthouse animation
Pop culture fiction
Postmodern television
Postmodern horror
Arthouse musical

References

External links
Post-modernism and Authorship in David Lynch's Blue Velvet
For a comprehensible introduction
From Postmodernism to Postmodernity: the Local/Global Context
In Search of The Postmodern: Chapter 1
10 Lesser-Known Postmodern Films|Philosophy in Film

 
 
1950s in film
1960s in film
1970s in film
1980s in animation
1980s in film
1990s in animation
1990s in film
2000s in animation
2000s in film
2010s in animation
2010s in film
2020s in film
Aesthetics
Concepts in aesthetics
Film genres
Postmodernism
Postmodern art
Theories of aesthetics
Visual arts